The Baltimore Federation of Labor (BFL), an affiliate of the American Federation of Labor, was formed in 1883, in Baltimore, Maryland.

History

In 1919, the Baltimore Federation of Labor helped found the Baltimore Labor College an outgrowth of its adult education department.

The Baltimore Federation of Labor was considered to be conservative. It was allied with the United Garment Workers of America. In 1913, it had a battle with the Wobblies for representation of Baltimore garment industry workers.

See also 

 American Federation of Labor
 Baltimore Labor College

References

External links 
 Baltimore Federation of Labor Collection. 1918–1969. 0.25 linear feet. University of Maryland Labor History Collection, Special Collections and University Archives, University of Maryland Libraries.

Trade unions in Maryland
American Federation of Labor
History of Baltimore
1883 establishments in Maryland